Eurychororhinus is a dubious genus of dicynodont from the Cistecephalus Assemblage Zone of the Karoo Basin, South Africa, and Zimbabwe. It is possibly synonymous with Pristerodon.

References

Dicynodonts
Lopingian synapsids of Africa
Fossil taxa described in 1935
Anomodont genera